John Melvin Rayfield (February 11, 1926 – March 1, 2010) was a former Republican member of the North Carolina General Assembly representing the state's ninety third House district, including constituents in Gaston county. He died in 2010 at a retirement home, of heart failure.

Electoral history

2004

2002

2000

References

External links

|-

1926 births
2010 deaths
People from Belmont, North Carolina
21st-century American politicians
Republican Party members of the North Carolina House of Representatives